The 2012–13 1. FC Saarbrücken season is the 106th season in the club's football history. In 2012–13 the club plays in the 3. Liga, the third tier of German football. It is the club's third season in this league, having been promoted from the Regionalliga in 2010. They are also participating in the DFB-Pokal and Saarland Cup.

Review and events

The club also took part in the 2012–13 edition of the DFB-Pokal, the German Cup, but was knocked out in the first round by Fußball-Bundesliga side FC Schalke 04.

1. FC Saarbrücken also takes part in the 2012–13 edition of the Saarland Cup, entering the third round with a match against SV Altstadt on 18 September.

Matches

Legend

3. Liga

DFB-Pokal

Saarland Cup

Overall

Squad

Squad and statistics

Transfers

In

Out

Sources

Match reports

Other sources

External links
 2012–13 1. FC Saarbrücken season at Weltfussball.de 
 2012–13 1. FC Saarbrücken season at kicker.de 
 2012–13 1. FC Saarbrücken season at Fussballdaten.de 

Saarbrücken
1. FC Saarbrücken seasons